Onshi-ike is an earthfill dam located in Aichi Prefecture in Japan. The dam is used for irrigation. The dam impounds about 2 ha of land when full and can store 111 thousand cubic meters of water. The construction of the dam was started on 1989 and completed in 1990.

References

Dams in Aichi Prefecture
1990 establishments in Japan